The Diocese of Des Moines is a Latin Church ecclesiastical territory, or  diocese, of the Catholic Church in the southwestern quarter of the state of Iowa in the United States.  It is a suffragan see in the ecclesiastical province of the metropolitan Archdiocese of Dubuque.  The see city for the diocese is Des Moines.  The cathedral parish for the diocese is St. Ambrose. 

Currently, William Joensen is bishop of the Diocese of Des Moines.

History

1830 to 1900 
Like other American dioceses, the area that makes up the present diocese was under the jurisdiction of a number of prelates. Most of these were purely academic because of no actual Catholic presence in the area. The first Catholic missionaries arrived in the Iowa area during the early 1830's. They were under the jurisdiction of the Bishop of Saint Louis, Joseph Rosati. 

In 1838, Pope Gregory XVI erected the new Diocese of Dubuque. This diocese initially included all of Iowa as well as a large part of the western United States.  By 1850. the diocese only included the state of Iowa. In the late 19th century, Bishop John Hennessey of Dubuque petitioned the Vatican to create a separate diocese for southern Iowa.  While he envisioned Des Moines as the see city for this new diocese, in 1881 the Vatican instead erected the Diocese of Davenport, including the Des Moines area.

1900 to 1967 
On August 12, 1911, Pope Pius X erected the new Diocese of Des Moines with territory from the Diocese of Davenport. Saint Ambrose Parish church became the cathedral for the new diocese. The pope in 1912 appointed Reverend Austin Dowling of the Diocese of Providence as the first bishop of Des Moines. In 1918, Dowling founded Des Moines Catholic College. A year later, Pope Benedict XV named Dowling as archbishop of the Archdiocese of St. Paul.

To replace Dowling in Des Moines, Benedict XV named Reverend Thomas Drumm in 1919. Drumm died in 1933. In 1934, Reverend Gerald Bergan of the Diocese of Peoria was appointed the third bishop of Des Moines by Pope Pius XI. He established a diocesan newspaper called The Messenger. Pope Pius XII named Bergan as archbishop of the Archdiocese of Omaha in 1948. Bergan's replacement in Des Moines was Reverend Edward Daly, named by the pope that same year. Daly died in 1964.

Auxiliary Bishop George Biskup of the Archdiocese of Dubuque was named by Pope Paul VI as the fifth bishop of Des Moines in 1965. In 1966, he purchased  from the Des Moines Golf and Country Club in West Des Moines to construct Dowling Catholic High School. He also started to implement the changes in the church as a result of the Second Vatican Council reforms.

1967 to present 
In 1967, after only two years in Des Moines, Paul VI appointed Biskup as coadjutor archbishop for the Archdiocese of Indianapolis. In 1968, the pope named Reverend Maurice Dingman of the Diocese of Davenport as the next bishop of Des Moines. On October 4, 1979, Pope John Paul II visited the diocese on the suggestion of Joe Hays, a farmer in Truro, Iowa, and on the invitation of Dingman. After landing at the Des Moines Airport, the pope visited the rural parish of St. Patrick near Irish Settlement. He then celebrated a mass at the Living History Farms in Urbandale, Iowa. Dingman retired due to bad health in 1986.

In 1987, John Paul II replaced Dingman as bishop of Des Moines with Auxiliary Bishop William Bullock from the Archdiocese of Saint Paul and Minneapolis. In 1993, the pope named him as bishop of the Diocese of Madison.  The new bishop of Des Moines was Auxiliary Bishop Joseph Charron from Saint Paul and Minneapolis, named by the pope in 1994.  Charron retired in 2007. In 2008, Pope Benedict XVI appointed Auxiliary Bishop Richard Pates from Saint Paul and Minneapolis as the ninth bishop of Des Moines. He resigned in 2018.

The current bishop of the Diocese of Des Moines is William Joensen from the Archdiocese of Dubuque. He was appointed by Pope Francis in 2019.

Reports of sex abuse
On September 19, 2003, Bishop Charron permanently suspended three diocesan priests from ministry due to sexual abuse allegations: Albert Wilwerding, John Ryan, and Richard Wagner. Charron was following the recommendations of an internal committee that had recommended their dismissal and ultimate laicization.

In January 2015, Pope Francis laicized Diocese of Des Moines priest Howard Fitzgerald, who was accused of committing acts of sex abuse. Fitzgerald had been placed on administrative leave in 2014.

On March 20, 2020, the diocese announced that it was suspending Reverend Robert Grant, a diocesan priest and professor at St. Ambrose University in Davenport, from teaching and practicing ministry after a sex abuse allegation surfaced The alleged sex abuse was committed during his time in the Diocese of Des Moines at St. Albert High School in Council Bluffs in the early 1990's.  The allegations were reported to the diocese after the victim reached out to sex abuse advocates. However, the statute of limitations in Iowa prevented the victim from pursuing criminal charges against Grant. The suspension was to last until the Diocese of Des Moines completed its investigation. In late 2022, the diocese determined that Grant's sexual misconduct took place when the victim was above the age of consent.  Therefore, the diocese returned grant to his ministry and teaching positions with restrictions.

Churches

Bishops

Bishops of Des Moines

 Austin Dowling (1912–1919), appointed Archbishop of Saint Paul
 Thomas William Drumm (1919–1933)
 Gerald Thomas Bergan (1934–1948), appointed Archbishop of Omaha
 Edward Celestin Daly, O.P. (1948–1964)
 George Biskup (1965–1967), appointed Coadjutor Archbishop and later Archbishop of Indianapolis
 Maurice John Dingman (1968–1986)
 William Henry Bullock (1987–1993), appointed Bishop of Madison
 Joseph Charron, C.PP.S. (1993–2007)
 Richard Pates (2008–2019)
 William Michael Joensen (2019–present)

Other priest of this diocese who became Bishop
John Joseph Boylan, appointed Bishop of Rockford in 1942

Schools

 High schools

Former High Schools

See also
Archdiocese of Dubuque
Diocese of Davenport
Diocese of Sioux City

References

External links

 

 
Christian organizations established in 1911
Des Moines